Sir Thomas Fife Clark (29 May 1907 – 29 March 1985) was a British journalist and civil servant.

Career
Clark served as Downing Street Press Secretary, between 1952 and 1955, under Prime Minister Winston Churchill. He then served as Director General of the Central Office of Information for almost seventeen years (1954–71). In this role, he produced long running campaigns for road safety and army recruitment as well as being in charge of the British Pavilions at the World Fairs.

Sir Fife Clark received a knighthood in 1965.

In 1971, Allen & Unwin published Sir Fife Clark's work, The Central Office of Information.

References

1907 births
1985 deaths
British journalists
British special advisers